Semper rehydration solution is a mixture used for the management of dehydration. Each liter of Semper rehydration solution contains 189 mmol glucose, 40 mmol Na+, 35 mmol Cl−, 20 mmol K+ and 25 mmol HCO3−.

References

Body water
Medical treatments

sv:Vätskeersättning#Sempers vätskeersätttning